This article is about the episodes of the reality TV show The X Factor.

Series 1

Series 2

Series 3

Series 4

Series 5

Series 6

Series 7

Series 8

Series 9

Series 10

Series 11

Series 12

Series 13

Series 14

Series 15

References

X Factor (British TV series) episodes
The X Factor (British TV series)